Giannis Andreou (born 8 October 1997) is a Greek professional footballer who plays as a centre-back for Ilioupoli.

References

1997 births
Living people
Greek footballers
Super League Greece 2 players
Football League (Greece) players
Gamma Ethniki players
Episkopi F.C. players
Association football defenders
Footballers from Larissa